Liu Zhidan (4 October 1903 – 14 April 1936), also known as Liu Chih-tan, was a Chinese military commander and Communist leader, who founded the Shaanxi-Gansu-Ningxia Base Area in north-west China, which became the Yan'an Soviet.

Early life
Liu Zhidan was born in 1902/3 into a literati family in Bao'an, since renamed Zhidan County in his honour, in northern Shaanxi Province. He was given the name Jinggui (Jǐngguì), which he later changed to Zhidan.   Liu attended the first primary school in the county and was a member of the first graduating class and gained acceptance to Yulin Middle School.  He joined the Communist Party in 1925.
In Yulin, he was influenced by the May Fourth Movement and joined the Chinese Communist Youth League and the Society for Mutual Progress, a progressive civic organization.

After the May 30th Movement, he and fellow students traveled to Shanxi, Beijing and Shanghai, before going to Guangzhou, where he was admitted to the Whampoa Academy.  In July 1927, he joined the Northern Expedition as an officer of the National Revolutionary Army and then was assigned to the National People's Army of Feng Yuxiang, who was allied with the NRA at the time.  After the April 12 Incident in 1927, Liu, as a Communist, fled from Feng's army and joined the armed Communist opposition.  After setbacks in Nanchang, Anhui and Shanghai, Liu returned to Shaanxi and organized a rural-based guerilla force.  In May 1928, he launched the Weihua Uprising (in modern Weinan) with several thousand men and established the National People's Army of the Northwest.  In June the uprising was put down by Song Zheyuan and Liu fled to northern Shaanxi (Shaanbei).

Red Army
In his native northern Shaanxi, Liu Zhidan founded the Shaanxi-Gansu Border Region and Northern Shaanxi Region base areas, and established the 26th and 27th Corps of the Chinese Red Army.  In the spring of 1934 and fall of 1935, he defeated two large suppression campaigns by Nationalist forces and managed to merge the two base areas, controlling 22 counties.

Chiang Kai-shek sent Zhang Xueliang to attack Liu's base in 1935 but Zhang's troops were soundly defeated by Liu in the Battle of Laoshan.  But shortly thereafter, Liu Zhidan fell victim to a vicious purge at the hands of commissars sent from Shanghai, then headquarter of communist.  He and his comrades were jailed.  Many subordinates were executed.  He was about to be executed when Mao Zedong and the Long Marchers arrived in the Northwest, halted the rectification campaign and had Liu and his comrades released.  Liu's base became a refuge for the other defeated Red Armies and grew to become the Yan'an Soviet, the primary base of the Chinese Communists until 1947.

Liu himself was dispatched by Mao to lead the Eastern Expedition against Yan Xishan.  He was killed in battle in  April 1936 and named a martyr.  His home county of Bao'an was later named after him.

Legacy
Liu Zhidan was hailed as martyr at the time of his death and remembered as such until 1962 when a biographical novel about his life was criticized by Kang Sheng as an anti-party conspiracy because one of the characters in the novel alluded to purged former leader Gao Gang. Xi Zhongxun, one of his former comrades and subordinates was purged as a result. During the Cultural Revolution, Liu's grave was ransacked by Red Guards.  After the Cultural Revolution, Liu's legacy was rehabilitated.

Notes

References

Bibliography
 
 

1903 births
1936 deaths
Politicians from Yan'an
Chinese Communist Party politicians from Shaanxi
Republic of China politicians from Shaanxi